Finish Line is a 1989 American made-for-television sports drama film  starring real life father and son James and Josh Brolin. The movie also features Stephen Lang as a hard driving track coach and an early appearance by Mariska Hargitay as a student reporter. The film was released at a time when little was known about the harmful effects of steroids. It was originally broadcast on TNT on January 11, 1989.

Plot
Glenn Shrevelow and Tito Landreau are childhood friends who share a mutual love of running. Their athletic prowess results in them receiving scholarships to a prestigious university. Their new coach tells them that they are among the fastest runners in the country and inspires them with visions of Olympic glory.

Glenn finds himself facing pressure from both his coach and his demanding father, himself a former runner, who pushes him to commit and excel. Desperate after falling behind in a race and facing the loss of his scholarship, he resorts to taking steroids after another track team member tells him that they will improve his performance and are the real "breakfast of champions".

It is during this time that Glenn meets Lisa Karsh, a student reporter doing a story on athletes and drugs and they begin to develop a romantic relationship. Glenn's journey into the world of drugs grows darker as he progresses from taking pills to injections. His father is furious when he find out but Glenn insists it is the only way he can excel.

Glenn finally pays the price when he suffers a heart attack after a grueling race. His heart has suffered massive damage and he is scheduled for a coronary bypass. Glenn's father begs his forgiveness after realizing he is partly to blame. Glenn is wheeled into the operating room and the final scene shows Glenn's father tearfully watching Tito win an Olympic race on television and dedicating it to Glenn who has died.

Cast
James Brolin as Martin Shrevelow
Josh Brolin as Glenn Shrevelow
Mariska Hargitay as Lisa Karsh
Stephen Lang as Coach Harkins

External links
 

1989 television films
1989 films
1989 crime drama films
1980s sports drama films
American sports drama films
American track and field films
American drama television films
Films directed by John Nicolella
Films scored by William Olvis
Sports television films
TNT Network original films
1980s American films
1980s English-language films